Valverde (Sicilian: Bedduvirdi) is a comune (municipality) in the Metropolitan City of Catania in the Italian region Sicily, located about  southeast of Palermo and about  northeast of Catania.  

Valverde borders the following municipalities: Aci Bonaccorsi, Aci Castello, Aci Catena, Aci Sant'Antonio, San Giovanni la Punta, San Gregorio di Catania.

References

External links
 Official website

Cities and towns in Sicily